Lucas Carvalho da Silva (born 1 April 1996), commonly known as Lucas, is a Brazilian footballer who currently plays as a right back for Figueirense.

Career statistics

Club

Notes

References

External links

1996 births
Living people
Brazilian footballers
Brazilian expatriate footballers
Association football defenders
Sampaio Corrêa Futebol e Esporte players
Fluminense FC players
Esporte Clube Democrata players
Tupi Football Club players
Esporte Clube Cruzeiro players
Veranópolis Esporte Clube Recreativo e Cultural players
SC Sagamihara players
J3 League players
Brazilian expatriate sportspeople in Japan
Expatriate footballers in Japan
Footballers from Rio de Janeiro (city)